The Lepsy (Lepsı) also known as the Lepsa River or the Lepsi River, is a river of the Balkhash-Alakol Basin, south-eastern Kazakhstan. It originates in the Dzungarian Alatau Mountains north of the border with China and flows into Lake Balkhash. The Lepsy is the easternmost of the two small rivers that flow into the eastern Balkhash on the south bank, the other being the Aksu. The Lepsy is one of the main rivers of the historic region of Zhetysu.

Course
The river flows north from the border with China before turning north-westward north of Sarkand and then west before turning north northward when it reaches the Saryesik-Atyrau Desert, a large sand desert south of Lake Balkhash. The river empties into Lake Balkhash just east of the Aksu River on  its southern side. Lepsy freezes up in December and stays icebound until March. Because of the amount of water taken for irrigation, the river's flow into Lake Balkash is limited.

References 

Rivers of Kazakhstan
Tributaries of Lake Balkhash